John Richard Burke (December 7, 1924 – August 7, 1993) was a Foreign Service officer and the United States Ambassador to Guyana during the Jonestown Massacre.

Born in Madison, Wisconsin in 1924, Burke was a First Lieutenant in the United States Army during World War II. He also served during the Korean War.

After his Korean service, he earned a master's degree from the University of Wisconsin–Madison.

Burke was the Ambassador to Guyana from September 30, 1977 to September 22, 1979.

Burke died of a heart attack on August 7, 1993 at his home in Arlington, Virginia. His ashes were interred at Arlington National Cemetery.

See also
 Ambassadors from the United States

References

1924 births
1993 deaths
Ambassadors of the United States to Guyana
United States Navy officers
University of Wisconsin–Madison alumni
Military personnel from Madison, Wisconsin
United States Foreign Service personnel
Burials at Arlington National Cemetery
United States Army personnel of World War II
20th-century American diplomats